Matthew Dicks (born February 15, 1971) is an American novelist, storyteller, columnist, playwright, blogger, and teacher.

His first novel, Something Missing, was published in 2009. He has since published Unexpectedly, Milo (2010), Memoirs of an Imaginary Friend (2012), The Perfect Comeback of Caroline Jacobs (2014), Twenty-one Truths About Love (2019), and The Other Mother (2020). Dicks' novels have been translated into 26 different languages. He publishes in the UK under the pseudonym Matthew Green.

Dicks has also published two books of nonfiction: Storyworthy: Engage, Teach, Persuade, and Change Your Life Through the Power of Storytelling (2018) and Someday Is Today: 22 Simple, Actionable Ways to Propel Your Creative Life (2022).

Dicks is the humor columnist for Seasons magazine and writes the Ask a Teacher column for Slate magazine. His work has also appeared in The Hartford Courant, Reader's Digest, Parents magazine and The Christian Science Monitor. He is the creator and cohost of the weekly podcasts Speak Up Storytelling and Boy vs. Girl.

Storytelling

Dicks began competing in live storytelling events in New York City 2011. He is a frequent participant in The Moth in New York City and Boston and has also told stories for the This American Life, The Story Collider, Literary Death Match, The Liar Show, and more. He is a record 58-time Moth StorySLAM winner and 9-time GrandSLAM champion. His stories have been featured multiple times on The Moth podcast and The Moth Radio Hour.

In 2013, Dicks and his wife, Elysha Dicks, founded Speak Up, a Hartford-Based storytelling organization producing more than a dozen shows each year at Real Art Ways, Connecticut Historical Society, and Infinity Hall in Hartford, CT as well as a variety of partner venues. Dicks also teaches and consults on storytelling, marketing, and advertising with individuals, nonprofits, corporations, and religious institutions. He has consulted and taught at Massachusetts Institute of Technology, University of Connecticut School of Law, Yale University, Harvard University, Purdue University, Yale New Haven Hospital, Kripalu Center for Yoga and Health in Stockbridge, MA, Graded School in São Paulo, Brazil, and many more.

Awards 

Dicks has worked as an elementary school teacher since 1999. In 2005 he was named the West Hartford Teacher of the Year and was named as one of three finalists for Connecticut's Teacher of the Year.

Dicks's third novel, Memoirs of an Imaginary Friend, won the 2014 Dolly Gray Award for Children's Literature.

The Connecticut Society of Professional Journalists awarded him first prize in opinion/humor writing in 2015, 2016, 2017, 2019, 2020, and 2021.

Early life 

Dicks was raised in the small town of Blackstone, Massachusetts. At age 16, he began working for McDonald's restaurants. At 17 he was promoted to manager. On December 23, 1988, Dicks was in a head-on car accident. Upon arriving at the scene, paramedics found him without respiration or pulse and began CPR. He was ultimately revived before arriving at the hospital. This is one of two near death experiences to which Dicks credits much of his drive for success. Dicks left home at age 18 and continued working in the restaurant business, including McDonald's, for several years.

In 1993 Dicks was robbed at gunpoint while managing a McDonald's restaurant in Brockton, MA. The incident left him suffering from post traumatic stress disorder for more than a decade.  Dicks thinks this incident was the impetus that sent him to college and launched his writing career.

Education 

Associate degree in 1996 at Manchester Community College in Manchester, Connecticut.

Bachelor's degree in English in 1999 at Trinity College in Hartford, CT.

Teaching certificate from St. Joseph's University in West Hartford, CT in 1999.

Master's degree in Educational Technology at American Intercontinental University in 2009.

Career 

Dicks has been working as an elementary school teacher at Henry A. Wolcott School in West Hartford, CT since 1999. He also owns and operates the Connecticut-based DJ company Jam Packed Dance Floor DJs. He has been entertaining at weddings since 1997. Dicks also works as a speaking coach, leadership coach, and marketing and communications consultant. Dicks also works as a minister of the Universal Life Church.

Bibliography 

Novels

 Something Missing (Doubleday, 2009) 
 Unexpectedly Milo (Doubleday, 2010) 
 Memoirs of an Imaginary Friend (St. Martin's Press, 2012) 
 The Perfect Comeback of Caroline Jacobs (St. Martin's Press, 2015) 
 Twenty-one Truths About Love (St. Martin's Press, 2019) 
The Other Mother (St. Martin's Press, 2021) 

Nonfiction

 Storyworthy: Engage, Teach, Persuade, and Change Your Life Through the Power of Storytelling (New World Library, 2018) 
 Someday Is Today: 22 Simple, Actionable Ways to Promote Your Creative Life (New World Library, 2022)

Family life 

Dicks is married to fellow teacher Elysha Green. They have two children.

References

External links 
 

American male novelists
21st-century American novelists
Living people
1971 births
American bloggers
American storytellers
Novelists from Massachusetts
Schoolteachers from Connecticut
Novelists from Connecticut
Trinity College (Connecticut) alumni
21st-century American male writers
American male bloggers